Waldemar Behn or simply called BEHN is an alcoholic beverage family company (Gesellschaft mit beschränkter Haftung) based in Eckernförde, Germany. It was established in 1892 and is now run by the fourth generation. 
It's also a local wholesaler ("BEHN-Getränke") and a producer of convenience food (Austrian affiliate "Nannerl").

BEHN established its first own liqueur brands in the 1950s but had to wait until 1992 to create a nationally recognized brand with the party drink Kleiner Feigling.  
In 2013 they bought Danish vodka brand Danzka from the French Marie Brizard Wine & Spirits/Belvedere corporation. Danzka boasts the fourth biggest vodka sales in duty free shops world wide, it is the first major foray abroad. Before the acquisition BEHN had a turnover of €43 million and 300 employees  and grew with it by more than 50%. The company refrains from publishing updated numbers.

Brands
Andalö
Dooley's, established in 2000
Küstennebel, established in 1985
De Geele Köm
Kleiner Feigling established in 1992
Danzka

External links 
Waldemar Behn website 
Waldemar Behn website 
Company History

References

Alcoholic drink companies
German distilled drinks
Distilleries in Germany
Companies based in Schleswig-Holstein
Food and drink companies established in 1892
German companies established in 1892